The Assemblies of Yahweh is a nonprofit religious organization with its international headquarters in Bethel, Pennsylvania, United States.  The organization developed independently out of a radio ministry begun by Jacob O. Meyer in 1966. The Assemblies of Yahweh is the largest sacred name group, but it is not part of the Sacred Name Movement.

Origin
The Assemblies of Yahweh consider themselves to be the reconstituted Apostolic Assembly that went into dormancy in AD 70. The founder, Jacob O. Meyer, learned about the name Yahweh while he was taking a biblical theological course. As a result, he became convinced of the importance of exclusively employing the names Yahweh for God and later, Yahshua for Jesus. Meyer went on to found the Assemblies of Yahweh in 1969. The organization sometimes refers to itself as "Modern Day Elijah", because , means "My El is Yahweh", also alluding to Malachi 4 and Mark 9:12, concerning the return of the worship of Yahweh in the "latter days".

The Assemblies leaders call their faith 'True Worship', rather than Christianity or Judaism. They are less commonly known as Messianic (or Spiritual) Israelites, possibly based on John 4:23.

Mission statement
In 1969 the Assemblies of Yahweh received its charter from Berks County, Pennsylvania. The core of this charter reads:

Beliefs
 
The Assemblies of Yahweh profess to follow the Old and New Testaments as closely as possible. This causes the group to be viewed as an admixture of Judaism and Christianity, although they do not actually mix Christian or Jewish doctrines with the teachings of the Scriptures. They believe that in order to understand the will of Yahweh, the Bible must be harmonized and adhered to as infallible. Members believe it is integral to keep the commandments of Yahweh including the seventh day Sabbath from Friday sundown to Saturday sundown (Exodus 20:8), the holy days as defined in Leviticus 23 and Deuteronomy 16, and a diet of clean foods as defined in Leviticus 11 and Deuteronomy 14.

Eschatology

The Assemblies of Yahweh believes in a Great Tribulation, a Beast System which is interpreted to mean a world ruling government and synchronistic religion on this earth opposed to Yahweh's commandments (Revelation 12:17) and finally, a millennial 1,000 year Kingdom of Yahweh (Revelation 20:4) on this earth which will usher an era of productivity, miracles, love, peace and tranquillity through the universal keeping of the commandments with Yahshua the Messiah ruling as King over Earth.

Organizational structure
Leadership consists of:
 A "Directing Elder", responsible for the spiritual direction of the Assembly.
 "Teaching Elders", ordained to serve as instructional leaders.
 "Deacons", ordained to serve in the needs of the assemblies.
 "Senior Missionaries", consecrated to serve Yahweh in local areas; many times used as local leader and (or) a new-inquirer contact point.
 "Missionaries", consecrated to serve Yahweh in local areas to help spread their Faith.

The Assemblies of Yahweh is led by a Directing Elder, originally Jacob O. Meyer. In accordance with his will and last testament, the Assemblies of Yahweh has since been led by two followers: Teaching Elder Jonathan S. Meyer and Deacon Nathaniel A. Meyer. They are assisted by a group of individuals called "the Work of the Ministry" who assist in practical matters and provide counsel on questions of doctrine.

Educational
The Assemblies of Yahweh has two educational institutions located in Bethel, Pennsylvania, Obadiah School of the Bible and Dalet School.

Obadiah School
Begun in 1973 as Obadiah Assembly, a class concentrating on public speaking, Obadiah School has continued to grow and today has an extensive biblical curriculum. Centered on the Bible class, each course is biblical in nature. Today the graduates form the core of the Assemblies of Yahweh with many of the graduates going on to lead local Assemblies.

Dalet School
From its rudimentary beginnings in 1976, Meyer designed the Dalet School in the reflection of a one-room schoolhouse. The students are given the ability to hear the instruction of underclassmen (as a review) and overclassmen (as a preview). The school today teaches over 40 children and contains classes from kindergarten through 12th grade.

Witnessing
The Assemblies of Yahweh witness in nearly every format available to them. They believe that radio station WMLK will be instrumental in reaching people all over the world and especially those countries that censor their networks or resist religious programs. The Assemblies of Yahweh uses many tools to spread their message across the world and contact individuals.

Monthly
 The Sacred Name Broadcaster
 The Narrow Way Magazine
 The Narrow Way Newsletter

Books
 The Sacred Scriptures Bethel Edition Bible LCN-81-69752
 Psalms, Anthems and Spiritual Songs
 The Memorial Name Yahweh LCN-87-072550
 Commentary on Galatians LCN 83-82474
 Commentary on Micah LCN-2006901945
 Commentary on Revelation Vol. 1 LCN-2006901947
 Biblical Ecclesiastical Assembly Administration LCN-2006908256

Radio
 The Sacred Name Broadcast
 WMLK Shortwave
 Simulcast of WMLK Shortwave (Internet)
 24/7 Internet radio

Television
 The Sacred Name telecast
 Online telecasts

Internet
 AOY website

Sabbath services
 Local Assemblies around the world 
 Live Internet streaming (audio and video)
 Cassette tape lending program

Ministerial trips
 Periodical Bible conferences
 Baptism, marriage, funeral requests, prison visitation, personal contact

Local target areas
 Tract distribution
 Radio and TV spots

References

External links
 Assemblies of Yahweh official website

 
Sacred Name Movement